Nagvada is an archaeological site belonging to Indus Valley civilisation, located in Dasada Taluka, Surendranagar district, Gujarat, India.

See also

Shikarpur, Gujarat
Kerala-no-dhoro

References

External links
 Archaeological Survey of India Report

Indus Valley civilisation sites
Archaeological sites in Gujarat
Former populated places in India
Surendranagar district